Lawson Omar Clifford (22 June 1878 – 7 December 1937) was a Liberal party member of the House of Commons of Canada. He was born in Oshawa, Ontario and became a farmer, fruit grower and rancher.

He was elected to Parliament at the Ontario South riding in the 1921 general election. During his only federal term, the 14th Canadian Parliament, riding boundaries were changed so that Clifford became a candidate in the new Ontario riding. In the 1925 federal election, Clifford ran under an unknown party banner and was defeated by Thomas Erlin Kaiser of the Conservatives.

External links
 

1878 births
1937 deaths
Canadian farmers
Liberal Party of Canada MPs
Members of the House of Commons of Canada from Ontario
People from Oshawa